John Brannen may refer to:
 John Brannen (basketball) (born 1974), American basketball coach
 John Brannen (singer) (born 1952), American singer